Ron Dominguez (August 10, 1935 – January 1, 2021) was an American businessman who served as vice-president of Disneyland from 1974 until 1990, and of Walt Disney Attractions from 1990 until his retirement in 1994.

He and his family lived on the land in Anaheim where Disneyland was to be built. Disney purchased his family's land and a neighboring family's land and moved the two families' houses in between Main Street, U.S.A. and Tomorrowland and combined them into the first Disneyland administration building.

References

External links
Disney Legends Profile

1935 births
2021 deaths
Walt Disney Parks and Resorts people
Disney executives
People from Anaheim, California